Yuriy Kabanov (12 March 1939; Novgorod — 8 September 2014) was a Soviet sprint canoeist who competed in the mid to late 1960s. He won a gold medal in the K-1 4 x 500 m event at the 1966 ICF Canoe Sprint World Championships in East Berlin.

References

1939 births
2014 deaths
Soviet male canoeists
ICF Canoe Sprint World Championships medalists in kayak